Pouteria cicatricata is a species of plant in the family Sapotaceae. It is endemic to Brazil and has become rare due to habitat loss.

References

Flora of Brazil
cicatricata
Near threatened plants
Taxonomy articles created by Polbot